The name Ilsa has been used for six tropical cyclones worldwide, one in the Atlantic Ocean, three in the Eastern Pacific Ocean, and two in the Australian region of the Indian Ocean.

In the Atlantic:
 Hurricane Ilsa (1958)

In the Eastern Pacific:
 Tropical Storm Ilsa (1967)
 Hurricane Ilsa (1971)
 Hurricane Ilsa (1975)

In the Australian region:
 Cyclone Ilsa (1999)
 Cyclone Ilsa (2009)

Atlantic hurricane set index articles
Pacific hurricane set index articles
Australian region cyclone set index articles